Tambas (also known as Tambes, Tembis) is a West Chadic language spoken in Plateau State, Nigeria.

Notes

Further reading
A Sociolinguistic Profile of the Rom (Tambas) [tdk] Language of Plateau State, Nigeria

West Chadic languages
Languages of Nigeria